WNBW-DT (channel 9) is a television station in Gainesville, Florida, United States, affiliated with NBC. It is owned by MPS Media, which maintains a local marketing agreement (LMA) with New Age Media, owner of High Springs–licensed dual CBS/MyNetworkTV affiliate WGFL (channel 28) and low-power, Class A Antenna TV affiliate WYME-CD (channel 45), for the provision of certain services. All three stations, in turn, are operated under a master service agreement by the Sinclair Broadcast Group. The stations share studios on Northwest 80th Boulevard (along I-75/SR 93) in Gainesville and transmitter facilities on Southwest 30th Avenue near Newberry.

WNBW-DT began broadcasting on the final day of 2008 and was the first in-market NBC affiliate serving Gainesville since 1973, with NBC affiliates from Orlando and Jacksonville carried on cable serving as the primary source of the network's programming for the city. MPS Media, a virtual duopoly partner of New Age Media, owned the station and contracted with New Age to operate it. In 2014, Sinclair began providing many operational services for the New Age stations in lieu of an attempted purchase of most of the company. WGFL and WNBW simulcast the same local newscasts.

History
In June 2008, WGFL announced that it would be launching a new digital-only television station on September 8, utilizing a construction permit that had been filed for in 1996 as analog channel 29 and approved in 2005. Construction required the early termination of analog service from WGFL on July 28. 

New Age Media officially launched WNBW-DT on December 31, 2008, at 11:30 p.m. through an LMA with MPS Media, New Age's typical partner in such projects, which purchased the permit from its original owner, Pegasus Communications. On that date, WNBW began regular programming, bringing local NBC service back to Gainesville since WCJB-TV switched its affiliation from the network to ABC in 1973. Cable homes in the station's service area had been served by WESH from Orlando and WTLV from Jacksonville; MPS estimated 32,000 homes in Gainesville went unserved by the network prior to launching WNBW. It holds rights to enforce blackouts on out-of-market stations carrying NBC and syndicated programming such as WESH in Orlando, which originally served Gainesville and Ocala as the de facto affiliate. Cox Communications began offering WNBW to Gainesville-area cable subscribers on channel 9 beginning January 16, 2009, and it began blacking out WESH during network programming that July. Originally, WNBW indicated it would eventually air some local programming including local newscasts by the end of 2009, a requirement of its affiliation agreement.

On September 25, 2013, New Age Media announced that it would sell most of its stations, including WGFL and WMYG-LP, to the Sinclair Broadcast Group. Concurrently, MPS Media planned to sell WNBW-DT to Cunningham Broadcasting; the station would have continued to be operated by WGFL. On October 31, 2014, MPS Media requested the dismissal of its application to sell WNBW-DT; the next day, Sinclair purchased the non-license assets of the stations it planned to buy from New Age Media and began operating them through a master service agreement.

On July 28, 2021, the FCC issued a forfeiture order stemming from a lawsuit against MPS Media. The lawsuit, filed by AT&T, alleged that MPS Media failed to negotiate for retransmission consent in good faith for the stations. Owners of other Sinclair-managed stations, such as Deerfield Media, were also named in the lawsuit. MPS was ordered to pay a fine of $512,288.

Newscasts

WGFL and WNBW simulcast CBS 4 News, which produces 6:00 and 11:00 p.m. newscasts for the Gainesville area and cut-ins during the stations' respective national morning shows. The news service was known as GTN News until 2016 and produced by Independent News Network in Davenport, Iowa. The newscasts are currently presented from Sinclair's WPEC in West Palm Beach.

Technical information

Subchannels
The station's digital signal is multiplexed:

Until June 3, 2015, WYME-CD did not air a digital signal, as with the case of many Class A stations. WYME-CD is also broadcast as WNBW's fourth subchannel. 

As part of the repacking process following the 2016–2017 FCC incentive auction, WNBW shifted from transmitting on channel 9 to channel 8 on May 1, 2020.

See also
Channel 9 digital TV stations in the United States
Channel 9 virtual TV stations in the United States

References

External links
MyCBS4.com - Official website

NBC network affiliates
Comet (TV network) affiliates
Charge! (TV network) affiliates
Antenna TV affiliates
Television channels and stations established in 2008
2008 establishments in Florida
NBW-DT
Sinclair Broadcast Group